The Hunter 20 Fox C is a 20 ft keelboat designed by David Thomas and currently produced by British Hunter boats. It was produced by Select Yachts until 2008, but the design was bought by British Hunter when trading ceased.

Keel types

It is produced with either a bilge keel or twin leeboards. The bilge keel produces an angle of vanishing stability of 121°. A single lifting fin keel system is being designed.

Interior

The interior of the boat is larger than many 20 ft craft, due in part to the small cockpit. It incorporates a V-berth forward and two side-berths, with a galley to port at the rear and - unusually in a boat of this size - a separate heads compartment to starboard.

See also
 List of sailboat designers and manufacturers

Keelboats
Sailboat types built by Hunter Boats
Sailboat type designs by British designers